Arms and the Man is a 1932 British film based on the play Arms and the Man by George Bernard Shaw. It was written and directed by Cecil Lewis.

References

External links

1932 films
British black-and-white films
British romantic comedy films
1932 romantic comedy films
Films shot at British International Pictures Studios
1930s British films